Gervis may refer to:

 Gervis, Iran, a village in West Azerbaijan Province

People with the surname
 Bert Gervis, birth name of Burt Ward (born 1945), American television actor and activist
 Ruth Gervis (1894–1988), British illustrator

See also
 Tapps-Gervis-Meyrick baronets
 Jervis (disambiguation)
 Gervais (disambiguation)